Donald Lucius Grunsky(October 19, 1915 - January 13, 2000) served in the California State Assembly for the 32nd district from 1947 to 1953, and served in the California State Senate for the 23rd and 17th district from 1953 to 1976. During World War II he also served in the United States Navy.  Grunsky is best known for having sponsored the legislation that made the hallucinogen LSD illegal.  After California became the first state to ban the drug, effective October 6, 1966, other states followed suit and the U.S. federal government included LSD as one of its Schedule I drugs under the Controlled Substances Act of 1970.

References

Republican Party members of the California State Assembly
1915 births
2000 deaths
United States Navy personnel of World War II